Shelly Stokes (born October 26, 1967) is an American, former collegiate All-American and Olympic champion, right-handed softball player originally from Sacramento, California. Stokes was a catcher for the Fresno State Bulldogs in the Big West Conference from 1987-90. She led them to three back-to-back runner-up finishes in the 1988, 1989 and 1990 Women's College World Series, also being named All-Tournament in the 1989 series. Stokes would go on to win gold with Team USA in the 1996 Atlanta Olympics.

Career

She competed at the 1996 Summer Olympics in Atlanta where she received a gold medal with the American team. Stokes had a hit, RBI and walked twice at the games.

Stokes played NCAA softball for California State University, Fresno.

Statistics

Fresno State Bulldogs

References

External links
 
 

1967 births
Living people
Fresno State Bulldogs softball players
Olympic softball players of the United States
Olympic gold medalists for the United States in softball
Softball players at the 1996 Summer Olympics
Medalists at the 1996 Summer Olympics
Sportspeople from Sacramento, California
Softball players from California